Burgh is an Anglo-Norman surname. Notable people with the surname include:

Surname

A
Albert Burgh (1593–1647), Dutch physician

J
James Burgh (1714–1775), English Whig politician
John Burgh (disambiguation), multiple people:
 John Burgh I (fl. 1399), MP for Bodmin in 1399
 John Burgh II (died 1434), MP for Surrey 1413–1416
 John Burgh III (died 1436), MP for Rutland 1413–1415 and Leicestershire 1421 and 1433
 John Burgh (MP for Brackley), see Brackley (UK Parliament constituency)
 John Burgh (MP for Wallingford), see Wallingford (UK Parliament constituency)
 Sir John Burgh (died 2013), senior British civil servant and President of Trinity College, Oxford

T
 Thomas Burgh (disambiguation), multiple people:
 Thomas Burgh of Gainsborough (c.1431–1496), English peer and High Sheriff of Lincolnshire 1460
 Thomas Burgh, 1st Baron Burgh (c.1488–1550), English peer and 5th Baron Strabolgi
 Thomas Burgh, 3rd Baron Burgh (c.1558–1597), English peer, 7th Baron Strabolgi, Lord Deputy of Ireland 1597
 Thomas Burgh (1670–1730) or de Burgh, Irish military engineer, architect, MP and Surveyor General of Ireland
 Thomas Burgh (Lanesborough MP) (1696–1758), Anglo-Irish politician and MP
 Thomas Burgh (died 1759) (1707–1759), Irish politician and MP
 Thomas Burgh (1754–1832), Irish politician and MP
 Thomas Burgh (MP died 1810), Irish politician and MP for Kilbeggan, Clogher and Fore
 Thomas Burgh (priest) (1786–1845), Dean of Cloyne

U
Ulysses Burgh (1632–1692), Irish Anglican cleric and Bishop of Ardagh
Ulysses Burgh, 2nd Baron Downes (1788−1864) Irish soldier and politician

See also
 de Burgh, surname
 DeBerg, surname
 Burke (disambiguation)
 de Burgh-Canning
 House of Burgh, an Anglo-Norman and Hiberno-Norman dynasty founded in 1193
 Clanricarde (Mac William Uachtar/Upper Mac William) or Galway (Upper Connaught) Burkes
 Earl of Clanricarde, earldom in the Peerage of Ireland created in 1543 and 1800
 Lord of Connaught, title claimed in the Peerage of Ireland
 Earl of Ulster, earldom created in the Peerage of Ireland in 1264
 Bourke (disambiguation)
 Burgo (disambiguation)
 De Burghs Bridge, road bridge in Sydney, Australia
 Bourg (disambiguation)
 Dubourg, surname

Norman-language surnames